Lost River 1 Airport  is an airport located at Lost River, in the Nome Census Area of the U.S. state of Alaska.

Facilities and aircraft 
For the 12-month period ending August 16, 1983, the airport had 500 aircraft operations, an average of 41 per month: 80% air taxi and 20% general aviation.

See also 

References

External links

 FAA Alaska airport diagram (GIF)
 Topographic map from USGS The National Map
 Lost River 1 Airport at SkyVector

Defunct airports in Alaska
Airports in the Nome Census Area, Alaska